Saint Bernice is an unincorporated census-designated place in Helt Township, Vermillion County, in the U.S. state of Indiana. It had a population of 646 at the 2010 census.

History
A post office has been in operation at Saint Bernice since 1867. The plat was filed in 1905. The origin of the name Saint Bernice is obscure.

Geography

Demographics

References

Census-designated places in Vermillion County, Indiana
Census-designated places in Indiana
Terre Haute metropolitan area